Air Vice Marshal P. D. J. Kumarasiri (also known as Jayanath Kumarasiri) USP, psc, MAIAA, AMRAeCS, EDBA, PGDiplE, DipQM was the former Director of Aeronautical Engineering for the Sri Lanka Air Force.

Early life
Jayanath was educated at Nalanda College Colombo.

References

 Nalanda Ranaviru Upahara'13

Living people
Sri Lanka Air Force air vice-marshals
Sinhalese military personnel
Sinhalese engineers
Alumni of Nalanda College, Colombo
Year of birth missing (living people)